Willie James Gault (born September 5, 1960) is an American former professional football player who was a wide receiver in the National Football League (NFL) for 11 seasons with the Chicago Bears and Los Angeles Raiders. Considered one of the fastest NFL players of all-time, Gault was a member of the Bears team that won Super Bowl XX. He was also a member of the U.S. Olympic team that boycotted the 1980 Olympics.

Gault played college football at the University of Tennessee from 1979 to 1982.  He led the Vols in all-purpose yardage as a sophomore, junior and senior, and was named to the All-American team in 1982.  He still holds numerous school kickoff return records.

Gault married his high school sweetheart, writer/author/actress Dainnese Mathis Gault in 1983. They were married from 1983 to 2002 and have two children.

Gault is currently pursuing a career as an actor.  He also remains active in masters athletics, setting world masters records in the 100 metres and 200 metres dashes for the 45–49, the 50–54, and the 55–59 age groups.

High school
Gault was born and raised in Griffin, Georgia.  He was named for his mother, Willie Mae.  Both of his parents worked in a textile mill.  He later recalled that his classmates  considered him a "teacher's pet."

Gault played football and ran track for Griffin High School.  He had two receptions for 19 yards in Griffin's 7-7 tie against Valdosta in the AAAA State Championship Game during his junior year.  He had a 48-yard touchdown catch for the North team in the 1979 GACA North/South Game (a preseason all-star game).  During his senior year, he caught 33 passes and scored 7 touchdowns, averaging 19 yards per catch.  He was named All-State following his junior and senior seasons.

University of Tennessee

Football
Gault played football at Tennessee during an era when the school was acquiring its reputation as "Wide Receiver U."  Three of Gault's teammates— Anthony Hancock, Clyde Duncan, and Tim McGee— would be first-round NFL Draft picks, and three others— Mike Miller, Lenny Taylor and Darryal Wilson— would be drafted in later rounds.  During his four years at UT, Gault caught 89 passes for 1,482 yards and 10 touchdowns, returned 78 kickoffs for 1,854 yards and four touchdowns, and returned 78 punts for 659 yards and a touchdown.

During the regular season of his freshman year in 1979, Gault caught three passes for 95 yards, including a 69-yard touchdown in Tennessee's 51-18 win over Utah.  He had a team-leading four catches for 22 yards in the Vols' 27-22 loss to Purdue in the 1979 Bluebonnet Bowl.

Gault's breakout year came during the 1980 season.  Though he caught a relatively modest 14 passes for 240 yards while splitting time with Miller at receiver, he returned 24 kickoffs for 662 yards, and tied a national single-season record by returning three kickoffs for touchdowns.  He returned a kickoff 100 yards for a touchdown to provide Tennessee's lone score in the team's 30-6 loss to Pittsburgh.  He then returned kickoffs for touchdowns in back-to-back games at the end of the season: a 92-yarder against Kentucky and a 98-yarder against Vanderbilt.  Calling the latter play for the Vol Network, long-time broadcaster John Ward shouted, "Ladies and gentlemen, Willie Gault has run all the way to the State Capitol."  Gault added a 48-yard touchdown catch in the Kentucky win.

During his junior year in 1981, Gault caught 22 passes for 479 yards and four touchdowns while continuing to split time with Miller.  He also added to his reputation as a dangerous return man, with 28 kickoff returns for 606 yards, and 31 punt returns for 381 yards and a touchdown.  In Tennessee's 28-20 win over Ole Miss, Gault had a 54-yard kickoff return, a 66-yard punt return for a touchdown, and a 49-yard punt return.  He returned a punt 66 yards for an apparent touchdown against Auburn, but it was called back on a penalty.  He caught a 75-yard touchdown pass in the Vols' loss to Alabama, and registered a 49-yard touchdown catch against Memphis State.  He had 217 receiving yards against Vanderbilt, including an 80-yard touchdown catch and a 72-yard reception.  In Tennessee's 28-21 win over Wisconsin in the 1981 Garden State Bowl, Gault returned a kickoff 87 yards for the Vols' first touchdown of the game.

Gault entered his senior year a Preseason All-American.  As part of an explosive receiving corps that included Mike Miller, Lenny Taylor and Darryal Wilson, Gault registered a team-leading 50 catches for 668 yards and four touchdowns.  He also registered 23 kickoff returns for 549 yards and a touchdown, and 20 punt returns for 145 yards. He caught touchdown passes of 78 yards and 38 yards in Tennessee's 24-14 loss to Auburn, and returned a kickoff 96 yards for a touchdown in the Vols' 24-24 tie against LSU.  Gault caught a 52-yard touchdown pass in Tennessee's 35-28 win over Alabama, helping the Vols break an 11-year losing streak to the Tide.  He caught a 19-yard touchdown pass in Tennessee's 28-22 loss to Iowa in the 1982 Peach Bowl.   He was named an All-American at the end of the  season.

As of the 2012 season, Gault's 1,854 kickoff return yards and 2,513 total return yards remain  school records.  His 27.6 yards per kickoff return in 1980 and his 987 total return yards in 1981 remain school single-season records.  Gault's mark of 4,035 career all-purpose yards is the second-highest tally in school history, trailing only Stanley Morgan's 4,642.  His 273 all-purpose yards against Auburn in 1982 and 268 against Vanderbilt in 1981 remain the second and third-highest single game tallies in school history, trailing only Chuck Webb's 294 yards in the 1989 Ole Miss game.

Track and field

Gault qualified for the 1980 U.S. Olympic team and would have participated in the 1980 Summer Olympics in Moscow had the United States not boycotted the event. He was one of 461 athletes to receive a Congressional Gold Medal.
Gault set a record in the 110-meter high hurdles at the SEC track and field championships in May 1981.  At the 1982 SEC championships, he again set the 110-meter high hurdles record, and won the Commissioner's Trophy for the highest overall score.  He won the 60-yard hurdles event at the 1983 SEC indoor championships with a time of 7.05.  At the 1983 NCAA Indoor Track and Field Championships, Gault won the 60-yard high hurdles and the 60-yard dash with times of 6.98 and 6.18, respectively.  At the 1983 NCAA outdoor championships, Gault placed third behind Roger Kingdom and Reggie Towns in the 110-meter high hurdles.

Gault was part of a world record-setting 4 × 100 meter relay team (1. Emmit King, 2. Willie Gault, 3. Calvin Smith, 4. Carl Lewis) at the 1983 World Championships. He also competed in the 110 meter hurdles and attended the Liberty Bell Classic, where he won a bronze medal in the 100 meter race).  He made the 1988 Winter Olympics bobsledding team as an alternate. His official personal bests are 13.26 seconds in the 110 meter hurdles and 10.10 seconds in the 100 meters.

Personal bests

Professional football career
Gault was drafted by the Chicago Bears in the first round (18th overall pick) in the 1983 NFL Draft, and had an immediate impact during his rookie season. He caught four passes for 103 yards and a touchdown in the Bears' loss to New Orleans, five passes for 103 yards and a touchdown in the Bears' loss to Baltimore, and four passes for 129 yards and an 87-yard touchdown in the Bears' loss to Green Bay.  Gault was the prototypical "speed merchant", meaning his greatest asset was his pure straight line swiftness.

During the Bears' dominant 1985 season, Gault caught 33 passes for a team-leading 704 yards.  His best game of the season came in the Bears' 33–24 win over Minnesota, when he caught six passes for 146 yards, including a 70-yard touchdown.  In the Bears' 46–10 victory over New England in Super Bowl XX, Gault had four receptions for a game-leading 129 yards, and four kickoff returns for 49 yards. At the end of the 1985 regular season, Gault helped organize teammates to perform the "Super Bowl Shuffle", a rap song and music video that raised money for a local charity.  He sang one verse in the song.

By the 1986 season, friction had developed between Gault and Bears quarterback Jim McMahon.  In his autobiography published that year, McMahon suggested that Gault was undependable, and only put forth his best effort if the game was on national television.  Gault stated in an interview with Sports Illustrated that he wasn't sure why McMahon seemed hesitant to throw it to him more often (the Sports Illustrated article's author, Bruce Newman, suggested that Gault didn't get as many throws because he was frequently double-teamed).  In spite of this squabble, Gault finished the 1986 season with 42 catches for 818 yards, including 7 catches for 174 yards against Cincinnati, and four catches for 116 yards against Tampa Bay.

Prior to the 1988 season, Gault was traded to the Los Angeles Raiders. He caught four passes for 102 yards in the Raiders' loss to Cincinnati on October 2, 1988.  He caught four passes for 131 yards and a touchdown in the 1989 season opener against San Diego, and had 147 yards on just two catches in the Raiders' win over Cincinnati on November 5, 1989.  He caught four passes for 103 yards to help the Raiders defeat his former team on September 30, 1990.  The Raiders did not re-sign Gault following the 1993 season.

In spite of his speed, Gault never won the NFL's "Fastest Man" competition over 60 yards (outdoors).  He placed second behind frequent winner Darrell Green in 1986, having defeated fellow Olympic sprinter Ron Brown in the semifinals.  In the 1990 competition, Gault again placed second, losing to Brown in the finals (Green was recovering from an injury and didn't compete). Green (a cornerback) would frequently cover Gault when their respective teams played. In the Bears' 23–19 win over Washington in the 1984 playoffs, Gault beat Green for a 75-yard touchdown reception after getting held without a catch in the first half. In the Bears' loss to the Redskins in the 1986 playoffs, Gault had five catches for 82 yards, including a 50-yard touchdown, while going head to head with Green. In the Redskins' 21-17 win over the Bears in the 1987 playoffs, Green held Gault without a catch before leaving the game with an injury. In the Raiders' 21–20 win over the Redskins in 1992, Gault went without a reception for most of the game before beating Green for a 50-yard catch that set up the winning touchdown.

Gault finished his 11 NFL seasons with 333 receptions for 6,635 yards. He also returned 9 punts for 60 yards, rushed for 154 yards, returned 45 kickoffs for 1,088 yards, and scored 45 touchdowns (44 receiving and 1 kickoff return).

NFL career statistics

After retiring as a player

During the late 1980s Willie Gault also owned a trendy upscale clothing boutique in Chicago.

Gault retired in the early 1990s and is pursuing an acting career in Hollywood. He portrayed Willie the Sweeper in the NBC series The Pretender. Willie also had an appearance on the sitcom Still Standing playing himself as the father of Tina's friend. He had a few appearances on Ned's Declassified School Survival Guide playing himself alongside sportscaster Van Earl Wright and most recently was featured in the series finale. He also was in an episode of MTV's Parental Control. In Season 4 Episode 8 of Friday Night Lights, the Dillon Lions radio color-man is named Willie Gault as a tribute.

Gault joined other members of the 1985 Chicago Bears in resurrecting the Super Bowl Shuffle in a Boost Mobile commercial for Super Bowl XLIV.

Gault has been active at the highest levels of Masters athletics.  On June 24, 2006, Gault set a world record of 10.72 seconds in the master's 100 meters, in the division for athletes aged 45 to 49. On April 26, 2008, Gault (at age 47) set a new world record of 21.80 seconds in the M45-49 age-group for 200m.  In May 2011, he set world records for the 50-54 age group in the 100-meter (10.88) and 200-meter (22.44) dashes.

In April 2016, Gault was ordered to pay $206,571 to settle a Securities and Exchange Commission lawsuit regarding his actions in a scheme to inflate share prices of the medical device company Heart Tronics Inc, for which he had been co-CEO. Gault was cleared of the most serious fraud charges.

In November 2016, Gault was inducted into the 2017 class of the Tennessee Sports Hall of Fame.

Gault was inducted into the Georgia Sports Hall of Fame, in Macon, Georgia, as a member of the 2017 class.

Gault was inducted into the USATF Masters Hall of Fame in 2019.

Filmography

References

External links

Entry at Tennessee Sports Hall of Fame

Additional References:  
USATF Masters Hall of Fame

1960 births
Living people
African-American players of American football
African-American male track and field athletes
American male bobsledders
American football wide receivers
American male hurdlers
American male sprinters
Chicago Bears players
Legends Football League coaches
Los Angeles Raiders players
American masters athletes
Tennessee Volunteers football players
People from Griffin, Georgia
Players of American football from Georgia (U.S. state)
World Athletics Championships athletes for the United States
World Athletics Championships medalists
World record holders in masters athletics
Track and field athletes from Georgia (U.S. state)
Congressional Gold Medal recipients
Universiade medalists in athletics (track and field)
Track and field athletes in the National Football League
Universiade gold medalists for the United States
World Athletics Championships winners
Medalists at the 1983 Summer Universiade
21st-century African-American people
20th-century African-American sportspeople